Hannah Miller House, also known as the William Joseph House, is a historic home located near Mossy Creek, Augusta County, Virginia. It was built about 1814, and is a two-story, banked stone "Continental bank" house style dwelling.  It sits on a full, but not fully excavated, basement and has an exterior stone chimney.  As of 1978, the interior of the house was absolutely plain and little-altered, with a single room on each floor.

It was listed on the National Register of Historic Places in 1978.

References

Houses on the National Register of Historic Places in Virginia
Houses completed in 1814
Houses in Augusta County, Virginia
National Register of Historic Places in Augusta County, Virginia
Stone houses in Virginia